is a retired Japanese football player. He was the first foreign player in the history of Guangzhou F.C. and the first Japanese football player in the Chinese professional league. He is now a businessman.

Career

Isamu Tsuji started his football career in Mitsubishi Motors F.C. youth team, but he found it difficult to become a professional footballer in Japan. He moved to Guangzhou Apollo of China in 1993 along with his teammate Yoshinori Hiroshima and Kang Chou-Su at the recommendation of the former Mitsubishi Motors youth team coach Zhao Dayu, whose mother team was Guangzhou Apollo.

Tsuji's dream came true after one year's hard training. In 1994, he became a professional footballer and participated in the Chinese Jia-A League as a striker of Guangzhou Apollo. It wasn't a successful season for Tsuji, because Guangzhou Apollo had a talented striker Hu Zhijun, 1994 Chinese Football Association golden boot awardee. Tsuji only played 4 matches (33 minutes in total) and didn't score a goal

Tsuji was then loaned to Hong Kong First Division League side Frankwell. In August 1995, he decided to retire and returned to Japan.

After retirement

Tsuji became a businessman after retirement. He was forgotten by Chinese football fans until 2007, when he returned to Guangzhou for personal reasons. Soccer Night, which airs on CCTV and is the most popular football program in China, contacted him and then told the story of his career with the Chinese Jia-A League. He is now well known as the first Japanese player in the Chinese professional football league.

References

External links
 "See Isamu Tsuji Again",broadcasting by CCTV on September 6, 2007.

Living people
Guangzhou F.C. players
Japanese footballers
Japanese expatriate footballers
Expatriate footballers in China
Expatriate footballers in Hong Kong
1973 births
Japanese expatriate sportspeople in China
Japanese expatriate sportspeople in Hong Kong
Association football forwards